Sorry Ma, Forgot to Take Out the Trash is the first studio album by the American band The Replacements. It was released on August 25, 1981 by Twin/Tone Records. Squarely inspired by punk rock, the album stands in contrast to the more creatively diverse power pop and indie rock styles on later albums.

Music and lyrics
The beginning of Johnny Cash's performance live at Folsom Prison can be heard at the beginning of the track "Rattlesnake"

The track "Somethin' to Dü" is a reference to the band Hüsker Dü, contemporaries of The Replacements and their Saint Paul counterparts. The track "Johnny's Gonna Die" is a reference to influential guitarist Johnny Thunders of the Heartbreakers and New York Dolls. The song refers to his increased heroin addiction and resultant sloppy live performances.  Thunders died, possibly of drug-related causes, in 1991.

Release
Sorry Ma, Forgot to Take Out the Trash was released on August 25, 1981 by the independent record label Twin/Tone Records. The song "I'm In Trouble" was released as a single on August 7, 1981, containing an outtake, "If Only You Were Lonely", as its B-side. The album was remastered and reissued by Rhino Entertainment on April 22, 2008, with 13 additional tracks and liner notes by Peter Jesperson.

To celebrate its 40th anniversary, on October 22, 2021, Rhino Entertainment released a deluxe edition of the newly remastered album. Featuring 100 tracks spread across 4CDs and 1LP, it includes unreleased demos, alternative takes/mixes, and a previously unreleased 27-track live concert recorded on January 23, 1981 at 7th Street Entry in Minneapolis.

Critical reception

In a 1982 Trouser Press review, Robert Payes described the "I'm in Trouble" single, which was taken from the album, as "(p)ower pop with the emphasis on power, roaring guitars and energy galore." Retrospectively, AllMusic reviewer Stephen Thomas Erlewine considered Sorry Ma, Forgot to Take Out the Trash to be "one of the best LPs the entire scene produced in the early '80s." In a very positive review, Punknews.org praised the album for being different from its counterparts of the hardcore punk scene, stating that the album "never sacrificed its pop appeal for throat-searing screams and whiplash speed."

Track listing

Personnel
The Replacements
Paul Westerberg – vocals, rhythm guitar, producer
Bob Stinson – lead guitar
Tommy Stinson – bass guitar
Chris Mars – drums
Technical
Peter Jesperson – producer
Steven Fjelstad – producer, engineer
Paul Stark – mixer
Laurie Allen – photography
Erik Hanson – photography
Greg Helgeson – artwork
Pat Moriarity – artwork
Bruce Allen – artwork

References

External links

1981 debut albums
Albums produced by Paul Westerberg
The Replacements (band) albums
Rhino Entertainment albums
Twin/Tone Records albums